Maechler or Mächler is a surname. Notable people with the surname include:

Alex Maechler (born in 1987), American social media persona. 
Daniel Maechler (born 1974), Swiss skeleton racer
Erich Maechler (born 1960), Swizz cyclist
Pat Mächler (formerly Patrick, born 1983), Swiss politician, co-founder of Pirate Parties International
Patrick Mächler (born 1972), Swiss cross-country skier
Stefan Maechler, Swiss historian